Philip Trammell Shutze (August 18, 1890 – October 17, 1982)  was an American architect. He became a partner in 1927 of Hentz, Adler & Shutze. He is known for his neo-classical architecture.

Designed the HM Patterson & son spring Hill chapel, 1020 spring Street Atlanta Georgia 30309, 1928

Biography
Shutze was born in Columbus, Georgia  to Sarah Lee ( Erwin) and Phillip Trammell Shutze. He graduated with a B.S. in architecture from Georgia Tech in 1912, and Bachelor of Architecture from Columbia University in 1913. After winning the Rome Prize in 1915 he spent several years in Europe studying European architecture before returning to Atlanta to work for the architectural firm of Hentz, Reid and Adler. Shutze thereafter designed many well-known buildings in the Atlanta area, becoming a partner of the company in 1927. He was a Fellow of the American Academy in Rome. Shutze died in Atlanta on October 17, 1982.

He "was also known for his important collection of porcelain, silver, furniture, rugs, and paintings", which is on display in the Swan House of the Atlanta History Center. He is the subject of a signature, permanent exhibit at the Atlanta History Center.

Several of Shutze's works are listed on the U.S. National Register of Historic Places.

Work

Works include (with attributions including spelling variations):
Hirsch Hall of the University of Georgia School of Law
200 Peachtree, built 1927, 200 Peachtree Street NE, Atlanta, GA
Swan House, 3099 Andrews Dr., NW. Atlanta, GA, on the grounds of what is now the Atlanta History Center, (Schutze, Philip T.), NRHP-listed
Albert E. Thornton House, 205 W. Paces Ferry Rd. Atlanta, GA (Schutze, Phillip), NRHP-listed
May Patterson Goodrum House, 320 W. Paces Ferry Rd. in Atlanta, NRHP-isted
Academy of Medicine, 875 W. Peachtree St., NE Atlanta, GA (Shutze, Philip T.), NRHP-listed
East Lake Golf Club Clubhouse, 2575 Alston Drive SE, Atlanta, GA
Citizen's and Southern Bank Building, 35 Broad St. Atlanta, GA (Hentz, Adler & Shutze), NRHP-listed
Rutherford and Martha Ellis House, 543 W. Wesley Rd., NW Atlanta, GA (Shutze, Philip Trammell), NRHP-listed
Garrison Apartments, 1325–1327 Peachtree St., NE Atlanta, GA (Shutze, Philip T.), NRHP-listed
The Temple, built 1931, 1589 Peachtree St., Atlanta, GA (Shutze, Philip), NRHP-listed
Henry W. Grady High School, original 1924 building and 1950 renovations by Shutze
Garden Hills Elementary School
Harris Hall, Emory University (1929).
The Villa (1920) Ansley Park Atlanta, Georgia
Howard Theatre (1920), 169 Peachtree St. NE, Atlanta, GA
Norris/Camp House, (1937), 3049 Highway 29 N., Newnan, GA (Hentz, Adler & Shutze)
Monie Ferst House, 845 Clifton Road, (1929), Atlanta, GA
White Oaks (1957), 1209 Roe Ford Road, Greenville, SC

References 

Architects from Atlanta
20th-century American architects
Georgia Tech alumni
1890 births
1982 deaths